Acrocercops clepsinoma is a moth of the family Gracillariidae, known from Tamil Nadu, India. It was described by Edward Meyrick in 1916.

References

clepsinoma
Moths of Asia
Moths described in 1916